The Wulong Karst is a karst landscape located within the borders of Wulong District, Chongqing Municipality, People's Republic of China. It is divided into three areas containing the Three Natural Bridges, the Qingkou Tiankeng (箐口天坑) and Furong Cave respectively. It is a part of the Wulong Karst National Geology Park as well as part of the South China Karst, a UNESCO World Heritage Site.

Scenic areas

Three Natural Bridges

The Three Natural Bridges, a series of natural limestone bridges located in Xiannushan Town, Wulong County, are the nucleus of a  conservation area which includes the following features:
 Tianlong (天龙桥) Qinglong (青龙桥) and Heilong (黑龙桥) limestone bridges;
 Qinglong Tiankeng (青龙天坑);
 Shenying Tiankeng (神鹰天坑);
 Yangshui River Karst Canyon (羊水河喀斯特峡谷);
 Longshui Gorge (龙水峡地缝);
 Central Shiyuan Tiankeng (中石院天坑);
 Lower Shiyuan Tiankeng (下石院天坑);
 Seventy-two Branch Cave (七十二岔洞);
 Longquan Cave (龙泉洞);
 Immortal Cave (仙人洞);
 Hidden Monkey Stream (猴子坨伏流);
 Hidden Baiguo Stream (白果伏流).

Qingkou Tiankeng Scenic Area
The Qingkou Tiankeng Scenic Area is located around Houping Township, Wulong District and includes 5 tiankengs:
 Qingkou Tiankeng (箐口天坑);
 Niubizidong Tiankeng (牛鼻子洞天坑)
 Daluodang Tiankeng (打锣凼天坑)
 Tianpingmiao Tiankeng (天平庙天坑)
 Shiwangdong Tiankeng (石王洞天坑) 
and nearby caves. This is the only currently known tiankeng cluster in the world hypothesized to have formed by surface water erosion.

The Qingkou Tiankeng Scenic Area (sometimes known as the Houping mechanical-erosion karst tiankeng system) comprises a 7,134 ha core zone and 46,781 ha buffer zone for a total of 53,915 ha of protected area.

Furong Cave-Furong Jiang Scenic Area

Stalactites and other sedimentary features abound throughout the cave, and it is open daily for tours.

The Furong Cave-Furong Jiang area comprises a 3,941 ha core zone and 24,024 ha buffer zone, for 27,965 ha total protected area.

Flora
The Wulong Karst area has the following types of forests and plant communities.

Subtropical needle-leaved forest: Pinus massoniana, Cupressus funebris; mixed Pinus massoniana, and Cupressus funebris
Evergreen broad-leaved forest: species Pinus massoniana; families Cupressaceae, Taxodiaceae, Lauraceae, Theaceae, Elaeocarpaceae; and genera Castanopsis, and Quercus
Deciduous broad-leaved forest: Quercus fabrei, Quercus acutissima, and Kalopanax ricinifolium
Shrublands: Pyracantha fortuneana, Vitex negundo, and Distylium racemosum shrubs
Deciduous trees and shrubs: Quercus, Liquidambar formosana, Pyracantha fortuneana, Vitex negundo, and Ulmaceae
Bamboo forests: Phyllostachys heteroclada and Sinoca lamusaffinis

Protected plants include Ginkgo biloba, Eucommia ulmoides, Taxus chinensis, Handeliodendron bodinieri, Liriodendron chinense, Juglans regia, Phellodendron chinense, Fagopyrum dibotrys, Cinnamomum camphora, Camptotheca acuminata, Actinidia chinensis, and Gynostemma pentaphyllum.

See also 
 South China Karst

References

External links

Waterfall at Qingkou Tiankeng (箐口天坑侧壁的瀑布)

Karst formations of China
Landforms of Chongqing
Tourist attractions in Chongqing